Anemonia is a genus of sea anemones belonging to the family Actiniidae.

Species
The following species are recognized:

 Anemonia alicemartinae Häussermann & Försterra, 2001
 Anemonia antilliensis Pax, 1924
 Anemonia cereus Contarini, 1844
 Anemonia chubutensis Zamponi et Acuña, 1992
 Anemonia clavata (Milne Edwards, 1857)
 Anemonia crystallina (Hemprich et Ehrenberg in Ehrenberg, 1834)
 Anemonia depressa Duchassaing de Fonbressin et Michelotti, 1860
 Anemonia elegans Verrill, 1901
 Anemonia erythraea (Hemprich et Ehrenberg in Ehrenberg, 1834)
 Anemonia gracilis (Quoy et Gaimard, 1833)
 Anemonia hemprichi (Klunzinger, 1877)
 Anemonia indica Parulekar, 1968
 Anemonia insessa Gravier, 1918
 Anemonia manjano Carlgren, 1900
 Anemonia melanaster (Verrill, 1901)
 Anemonia milneedwardsii (Milne Edwards, 1857)
 Anemonia mutabilis Verrill, 1928
 Anemonia natalensis Carlgren, 1938
 Anemonia sargassensis Hargitt, 1908
 Anemonia sulcata (Pennant, 1777)
 Snakelocks anemone (Anemonia viridis) (Forskål, 1775)

References

 Biolib
 ITIS
 Animal Diversity
 NCBI

Actiniidae
Hexacorallia genera
Taxa named by Antoine Risso